Girolamo Fornari, O.P. (died 1542) was a Roman Catholic prelate who served as Bishop of Belcastro (1533–1542).

Biography
Girolamo Fornari was ordained a priest in the Order of Preachers.
On 4 August 1533, he was appointed during the papacy of Pope Clement VII as Bishop of Belcastro.
He served as Bishop of Belcastro until his death in 1542.

References

External links and additional sources
 (for Chronology of Bishops) 
 (for Chronology of Bishops) 

15th-century Italian Roman Catholic bishops
Bishops appointed by Pope Clement VII
1533 deaths